William Robert Fountaine Addison VC (18 September 1883 – 7 January 1962) was an English recipient of the Victoria Cross, the highest and most prestigious award for gallantry in the face of the enemy that can be awarded to British and Commonwealth forces.

Early life
The Reverend William Addison was educated at Robert Mays School, Odiham, Hants, and as a young man worked as a lumberjack in Canada. After studying at Salisbury Theological College, he was ordained in 1913 and became curate of St Edmund's Church, Salisbury (now closed).

First World War
Upon the outbreak of First World War, he volunteered for the Army Chaplain's Department. He became a Temporary Chaplain of the Forces, 4th Class in the Army Chaplain's Department, British Army, when the following deed took place on 9 April 1916 at Sanna-i-Yat, Mesopotamia, for which he was awarded the VC "for most conspicuous bravery":

He carried a wounded man to the cover of a trench, and assisted several others to the same cover, after binding up their wounds under heavy rifle and machine gun fire.
In addition to these unaided efforts, by his splendid example and utter disregard of personal danger, he encouraged the stretcher-bearers to go forward under heavy fire and collect the wounded.

Later life
Addison was a Freemason and was initiated into Aldershot Camp Lodge No. 1331 on 14 November 1923.

After the war, he continued as an army chaplain and served at Malta, Khartoum and Shanghai and at army bases in England. He was Senior Chaplain to the Forces from 1934 to 1938 when he left the army and became a parish priest.  He was Rector of Coltishall with Great Hautbois in Norfolk from 1938 to 1958. However, on the outbreak of World War II he returned to the army and again served as Senior Chaplain to the Forces. He died in St Leonards-on-Sea, East Sussex, and is buried in Brookwood Cemetery in Surrey.

A replica set of Addison's medals is on display at the Museum of Army Chaplaincy, and at Sarum College in Salisbury.

References
ADDISON, Rev. William Robert Fountaine, Who Was Who, A & C Black, 1920–2008; online edn, Oxford University Press, Dec 2007, accessed 19 Nov 2012

External links
Grave refurbished
Burial location of William Addison (Brookwood Cemetery)
The Brookwood Cemetery Society (Holders of the Victoria Cross Commemorated in Brookwood Cemetery)

1883 births
1962 deaths
British World War I recipients of the Victoria Cross
British Army personnel of World War I
British Army personnel of World War II
Royal Army Chaplains' Department officers
World War I chaplains
World War II chaplains
Military personnel from Hampshire
Burials at Brookwood Cemetery
People from Cranbrook, Kent
British Army recipients of the Victoria Cross
People from Coltishall
Freemasons of the United Grand Lodge of England
Alumni of Salisbury Theological College